Mawin Maneewong (born 5 November 1996) is a member of the Thailand men's national volleyball team who plays as a setter. He played for AFVC for 8 years and debuted in Thailand men's national volleyball team in 2015.

Clubs 
  Chonburi (2014–2016)
  Air force (2016–2020)
  Phitsanulok VC (2021–present)

Awards

Individual
 2018 Thai-Denmark Super League "Best Setter"
 2021–22 Thailand League "Best Setter"

Clubs 
 2015–16 Thailand League -  Bronze Medal, with Chonburi E-Tech Air Force
 2016–17 Thailand League -  Champion, with Air Force
 2017 Thai–Denmark Super League -  Runner-up, with Air Force
 2017–18 Thailand League -  Champion, with Air Force
 2018 Thai–Denmark Super League -  Champion, with Air Force
 2017–18 Thailand League -  Champion, with Air Force
 2019 Thai–Denmark Super League -  Runner-Up, with Air Force
 2021–22 Thailand League -  Runner-up, with Phitsanulok

Nations 
 2017 Southeast Asian Games -  Champion
 2018 Asian Men's Volleyball Cup - 5th place
 2019 Asian Men's Volleyball Championship - 11th place
 2019 Southeast Asian Games -  Bronze Medal

References

1996 births
Living people
Mawin Maneewong
Mawin Maneewong
Mawin Maneewong
Southeast Asian Games medalists in volleyball
Competitors at the 2017 Southeast Asian Games
Volleyball players at the 2018 Asian Games
Competitors at the 2019 Southeast Asian Games
Mawin Maneewong
Setters (volleyball)
Mawin Maneewong
Competitors at the 2021 Southeast Asian Games
Mawin Maneewong